Ochs Building may refer to:

Ochs Building (Davenport, Iowa), formerly listed on the National Register of Historic Places in Scott County, Iowa
Adolph C. Ochs House, Springfield, Minnesota, listed on the National Register of Historic Places in Brown County, Minnesota
Ochs Building (Chattanooga, Tennessee), listed on the National Register of Historic Places in Hamilton County, Tennessee